The Marvelous Misadventures of Flapjack (also known as The Misadventures of Flapjack, or simply Flapjack) is an American animated television series created by Thurop Van Orman for Cartoon Network. It premiered in the United States on June 5, 2008. It stars Van Orman as the voice of Flapjack, a naive young boy who was raised by a whale named Bubbie and is mentored by a crusty old pirate named Captain K'nuckles. Together the trio spend their days in Stormalong Harbor, where most of the show takes place, whilst getting into mishaps on the search for the elusive Candied Island.

Van Orman, who pitched the idea to Cartoon Network as early as 2001, incorporated his own dreams of marine adventures, acquired while living in Florida as a boy, into the series. After three seasons and 46 episodes, the series ended on August 31, 2010. During its run, Flapjack received two Primetime Emmy Award nominations, two Annie Award nominations, and one Golden Reel Award nomination.

Synopsis

Setting
Most characters live in the fictional city of Stormalong Harbor. The city is built on a series of docks in the middle of the ocean with little surrounding land. It is possible to actually swim underneath the city, which is often done by Bubbie. The wealthier citizens live on more elevated piers which have vegetation-growing land attached to it, while the lower class lives lower in the city. Stormalong also has a sewer system and a series of tunnels. Most inhabitants are sailors of some sort, and sailors and/or pirates are constantly visiting from other lands. Stormalong has a great variety of (often bizarre) shops, including a bar that serves candy instead of alcohol (The Candy Barrel). The city appears quite dystopian, having a high level of crime and loitering, and the only forms of law enforcement are the Dock Hag and a small police force.

Plot
The series revolves around three main characters: Flapjack, Captain K'nuckles, and Bubbie. Flapjack is a young man who was raised by a talking whale named Bubbie. Flapjack and Bubbie lead a peaceful life until the duo rescue a pirate by the name of Captain K'nuckles, who tells Flapjack of a place called Candied Island, an island made entirely of candy. Inspired by the adventurous pirate, Flapjack, Captain K'nuckles, and Bubbie get into strange predicaments and "misadventures" in search of candy, Candied Island, and the coveted title of "Adventurer". The three spend most of their time in Stormalong Harbor, their place of residence and home to many strange characters.

Episodes

Characters

Main

Flapjack (voiced by Thurop Van Orman) - A strange and innocent little man with two teeth in the top and bottom of his mouth who was found and raised by Bubbie, a talking whale. Flapjack's biological parents are never seen or mentioned, and no explanation is given for their absence. Flapjack is very naïve and oblivious to danger, even though he is easily caught up in perilous situations. He holds K'nuckles in extremely high regard, with his affection for the captain sometimes bordering on obsession. His catchphrase is "Adventure!" (said whenever excited). He is voiced by series creator Thurop Van Orman. During the ending of the final episode, Thurop's son Leif plays the role of Flapjack. Flapjack's original voice actor was meant to be Paul Reubens, but Reubens never showed up to any recording sessions, so Van Orman voiced Flapjack himself.
Captain K'nuckles (voiced by Brian Doyle-Murray) - An old Irish captain who claims to be the greatest adventurer the world has ever known. Nowadays, he prefers to nap and drink maple syrup, while telling outrageous tales of past adventures and getting Flapjack wrapped up in his high seas hi-jinks. In reality, his stories are either completely false, or nowhere near as adventurous or amazing as he leads Flapjack to believe. He may not be an entirely incompetent adventurer however, as he was able to steal the Mermaid Queen's heart and successfully escape her guards in "Gone Wishin'". He is a candy addict; he will do whatever it takes to get his hands on candy. Because of this, he is incredibly selfish, putting the well-being of himself and the acquisition of candy above all else. Because of his often selfish, rude, and openly villainous behavior, K'nuckles has earned the open hostility and disrespect of nearly everybody in Stormalong, but is still respected by other pirates. Although he has a habit of taking advantage of Flapjack for his own needs, he is actually fond of him and will often attempt to get him out of trouble when a scheme of theirs goes too far. He also defends Flapjack when others try to deceive him, something that he does on a regular basis. Most of his body is composed of wood: his hands are wooden, his legs are pegs and his behind (his "sittin' muscle", as he calls it) is a wooden board. He is also made of parts stolen by other pirates. Because of his artificial body, he makes mechanical noises when he moves. K'nuckles spends most of the adventures with Flapjack trying to find Candied Island. Flapjack often has to defend him when he is in trouble. During the ending of the final episode, Thurop Van Orman portrays live-action K'nuckles.
Bubbie Bubbie (voiced by Roz Ryan) - An anthropomorphic whale, she is Flapjack's devoted, adoptive single mother. Bubbie serves as the primary home and transport of both Flapjack and K'nuckles. She frequently disapproves of Flapjack's desire for adventure, but will always be won over. As told in "Oh Brother", she found Flapjack at sea in a bed of seaweed. Bubbie and K'nuckles frequently disapprove of each other's actions, especially concerning 'adventure'. She believes K'nuckles to be irresponsible, lazy, and a bad influence on Flapjack. However, Bubbie is classified as a hypocrite by K'nuckles because of how she has a consistency of being irresponsible and rule-breaking herself. It is revealed in "100 Per Census" that Bubbie's last name is the same as her first name. Flapjack and K'nuckles live in her mouth.

Recurring
Peppermint Larry (voiced by Jeff Bennett) -  The owner and manager of The Candy Barrel, the only place in Stormalong where adventurers can get candy besides the 99 Pence Store (with the exception of the Candy Trough, only seen in one episode). Peppermint Larry is shown as a generally nice person, but can also be hasty and selfish at times. Peppermint Larry is lonely and unsocial, so he made a woman of candy named Candy Wife; though he has an unattractive adopted daughter named Candy. He loves Candy Wife as if she were real, while most other residents of Stormalong "played along" to humor him; until the episode "Just One Kiss," the show was deliberately vague as to whether or not she was actually "alive" or a delusion in Larry's mind. He often buys her candy rings telling everyone she has a taste for expensive items. It is also shown he hates pickles, as when he was stranded on Pickle Island and when Candy Wife put pickle juice in his drink to strike back at Larry, who exclaims, "Pickle juice? I don't even like pickle juice!" He was once fired by the Dock Hag because he was using dead rats as puppets, and after wanted to be called "Mr. Larry." Larry has a bit of a grudge against K'nuckles, partially because of how K'nuckles is constantly bringing Flapjack in to the Candy Barrel without any money, but mostly because of K'nuckles' love interest in Candy Wife, which is revealed in "Love Bugs."
Doctor Julius Barber (voiced by Steve Little) - The current doctor and barber of Stormalong. He is not only a doctor and a barber, but also a certified candyologist. Like many characters in the show, Doctor Barber has an odd, unsettling demeanor.  His driving ambition is to perform surgery on and give hair cuts to as many people as possible. It is unclear whether his drive to perform surgery is motivated by his desire to help his patients or is caused by a terribly sadistic nature. His obsession with surgery leads him to always advise the simplest medical problems be addressed with a surgical procedure (much to the denizens chagrin). In an early episode, it is revealed that he feeds the leftover hair from his clients to an odd monster that lives under his barber shop. He seems to have a very secretive lifestyle that is far outside of what Flapjack and K'nuckles know. Doctor Barber sometimes gets shipments in from Candied Island.  Flapjack sometimes helps Doctor Barber with his insane shenanigans, often without understanding what Doctor Barber is really up to. Doctor Barber appears to live with his mother, though she resides in a dresser drawer and may simply be a voice Barber hears in his head a la Norman Bates in the film Psycho. Real or not, she seems to nag him about everything.  He is often quoted to say, "Hmmm, yes."
Dock Hag (voiced by Daran Norris) - The law enforcer of the Stormalong dock. She is portrayed as a semi-old woman with obvious obesity, and dark brown hair. She is seen to have a crush on K'nuckles, making a doll of him out of his "dock tickets". She never shows this outside of her home, and is usually cold and bitter to everyone who comes in contact with her. She has a rotten nephew named Lawrence, who is almost as mean as she is (though he plays tricks on people rather than just acting mean). It was shown that when she has to fill her ticket quota, she gives them to K'nuckles. She gives tickets to him even though he isn't doing anything and makes up rules so that she can give him more tickets. She was temporarily fired in "Mayor May Not" but it was never stated that she was rehired, implying that she just enforces the rules and writes her tickets for her own amusement and enjoyment. She unofficially won the beard contest and the hand of Peppermint Larry's ugly adopted daughter, Candy, and there are times when the two of them can sometimes be seen together. 
Sally Syrup (voiced by Jackie Buscarino) is a young girl who sells seashells in Stormalong Harbor. Her name was influenced by the old nursery rhyme 'Sally sells seashells by the sea shore'. Flapjack seemed to have a crush on her (he was producing "sweethearts" that popped out of his head whenever someone mentioned Sally, which Captain K'nuckles and Peppermint Larry sold for profit). The sweethearts turned out to be Blood Gnats, which Doctor Barber reveals to the entire Candy Barrel. When Flapjack realizes he is not in love with her, Sally sadly asks, "You, you don't love me?" even though she had displayed disgust at the prospect earlier. As she departs, Flapjack is seen taking off his scarf and waving it at the ship, shouting, "Farewell, Sally Syrup! I don't love you!" Sally answers, waving her own handkerchief at him, "I don't love you too!" Flapjack then sighs dreamily, indicating that, despite everything, he might love Sally Syrup. By the end of the episode she drifted away to Blood Island for more shells and to get rid of the Blood Gnats. Then in "The Return of Sally Syrup", it is found that Sally Syrup's father is The Professor and niece of The Inventor and she thought Stormalong Harbor was boring, until Flapjack tried to show her how fun it could be there. When she had to leave she said she actually did have fun. She and Flapjack shared a moment before she had to leave, when she was in the air and flying away she said, "The best part about today, was spending it with you" (speaking to Flapjack). When he asked, "Really?" she answered, "No, just kidding! Goodbye dummy!" although this could've just been an act to keep up her reputation. Flapjack then said "There goes my heart."
Eight-Armed Willy (vocal effects by Richard McGonagle) – An extremely large Giant Pacific Octopus with a cut sticking out of his head, resembling a hole. In "Skooled", Miss Leading dressed up like him to help Flapjack and Captain K'nuckles learn their left and rights. In "Willy! (Or Won't He?)", Flapjack tried to capture him with a group of people from Stormalong's only newspaper so that Flapjack could prove to Patch that he was an adventurer and so that they can get more ink for the newspaper, but as it turned out, Willy was happy to give them ink and also helped Flapjack with his bet. Willy is shown to be larger than 100 ft. and is constantly making it difficult for Flapjack and K'nuckles to steal candy. Aside from Candied Island, Flapjack and K'nuckles attempt to get candy from Willy's secret stash of candy, located in Willy's lair. Willy has an eye patch over his right eye due to blindness, and is shown to have terrorized Stormalong for years, as he is probably the reason for the Sea Monster Alarm. He is shown to be antagonistic, but he seems to care for Flapjack.
The Sailors
Patch (voiced by S. Scott Bullock) - A moustached white sailor who hangs out with Thomas.
Thomas Hatch (voiced by Kent Osborne) - A big-nosed white sailor with a bad temper. In most of the episodes he appears in, he is seen walking off-screen after being upset by someone, and the other sailors try to comfort him.
Satch - A black sailor who hangs out with Thomas.
The Inventor (voiced by Jeff Bennett) is a man who invents stuff to force child labor and is also the dastardly brother of The Professor. He invented a whale named W.O.O.S.H, which was designed to force children to help him achieve the goal of fastest thing in the Seven Seas. He invented the camera, but it is also powered by kids (having one of the kids draw whatever he saw). He is classed as a villain because he enforces child labor and is vengeful against Flapjack and K'nuckles, but sometimes he acts as if he weren't as bad as he seems (e.g. when he tried to help Flapjack and K'nuckles escape an overweight constable on a bicycle by offering them several inventions which they turned down).
Sea Urchins (voiced by Jeff Bennett and Kevin Michael Richardson) – Flapjack uses all of the polish Bubbie uses on her bells, so K'nuckles takes Flapjack to the other, bad side of Stormalong Harbor to get more. The duo encounter poor street urchin kids who demand their sea urchin back but Flapjack calls them sissies and the urchins track him down and try to fight Flapjack, only to be stopped by an angry Bubbie who threatens to flatten them if they come near him again. He invites them over for dinner and shelter & the urchins reward them with a song and dance routine. The next morning, however, they discover the urchins have taken off with their possessions, including Bubbie's prized bell collection. Flapjack and K'nuckles track them down, and the urchins challenge them to a dance-off. When the urchins' star dancer, Cheeks, takes a fall, the urchin's father steps in to intervene and accuses the urchins of killing his son and calls Jerry, who is the father of the urchins' leader, but then recognizes K'nuckles long-standing idol status in the bad part of Stormalong Harbor for his ability to "Do nothing for nobody". In the end, the urchins and their fathers give the bell collection back and Flapjack invites them inside Bubbie, who can't seem to take many people into her mouth. (Note: At the part of the episode where Bubbie intercepts the urchins' attempt to "get" Flapjack, Cheeks calls the urchins' leader "Ricky", when it is later revealed that his real name is "Oliver".)
Lady Nicklebottoms

Charles

Lolly Poopdeck

Captain Handy

Slippery Pete

Production
As a child, show creator Van Orman lived in Panama City, Florida, and "used to fantasize about living near the dock and having adventures all the time." When he was 13, his family moved to Utah, but Van Orman still dreamed of adventure. He worked after school as a janitor, saving money for a plane ticket back to Florida. There, he packed some rice and potatoes, and paddled a surfboard to Shell Island. He planned to live off sea urchins and "even speared a manta ray," but things soon went sour. Eventually he became badly sunburned and began to starve. He returned to the mainland, but later tried again: he "went to Mexico and lived in the jungles and found [himself] eating out of dumpsters." Orman took his failures in stride, chalking all these bad circumstances up as "part of the adventure".

Many of Van Orman's influences included the likes of Gary Larson, Jim Henson, Stephen Hillenburg, and even his old boss Craig McCracken. Van Orman was well known for his work on other Cartoon Network shows, such as The Powerpuff Girls, The Grim Adventures of Billy & Mandy, and Camp Lazlo.

The original extended theme song for the show was used only once, for a musical special titled 'All Hands On Deck'. Modest Mouse singer Isaac Brock, a fan of the series, provided vocals for the version in the special.

Van Orman attempted to pitch the concept to Cartoon Network in 2001. He created a short and incorporated many childhood favorites, with visual inspiration from older adventure novels. His first pitch was rejected, but he received a lot of feedback and re-pitched the concept in 2003.

The series works with Screen Novelties to produce the stop-motion and title card portions of the show.

Paul Reubens was originally selected to be the voice of Flapjack, but when Reubens did not show up to any recording sessions, Van Orman himself decided to voice Flapjack.

The series ended on August 31, 2010, after 3 seasons, 46 half-hour episodes, and 91 episode segments. The final episode, titled "Fish Out of Water", focused on Flapjack and K'nuckles turning into fish due to eating too much candy and, at the end of the episode, featured an appearance by creator Thurop Van Orman and his son Leif Van Orman, who played live action versions of Flapjack and K'nuckles after they once again eat too much candy. A live action version of Bubbie also appeared.

In other media

DVD release
The Marvelous Misadventures of Flapjack: Volume 1 Region 1 DVD was released on September 15, 2009, and contains the first ten episodes along with four bonus featurettes.

Video games
A Flapjack video game was confirmed by series creator Thurop Van Orman in Spring 2010 for the Nintendo DS system. When the show was cancelled, the game was cancelled with it. Flapjack and Captain K'nuckles appeared as playable characters in Cartoon Network: Punch Time Explosion; Peppermint Larry and Candy Wife acted as assist characters, while one of the stages is set within Bubbie's Mouth. Eight-Armed Willy appears as part of Flapjack's Punch Time Explosion and appeared as Ben 10's transformation in Crossover Nexus .

Reception
In his book The Encyclopedia of American Animated Television Shows, David Perlmutter regarded Flapjack as "a cleverly produced and amusing series that never completely got the exposure or respect it deserved. Creator Van Orman combined his life-long affection for the sea with a uniquely designed steampunk-type universe that brought to mind the technology and the moral ambigiuity inherent in 19th century media, as reflected in many fictional narratives from that time."

Journalist Melissa C. from Game Rant praised the show, stating, "The Marvelous Misadventures of Flapjack was creative, funny, and aesthetically pleasing. It should have at least gotten a few more seasons. Its legacy lives on because of the shows it inspired. If new episodes were made today, possibly with more live action elements, it would rival any show it was up against."

Industry impact 

Several former storyboard artists and production crew members who worked on The Marvelous Misadventures of Flapjack have gone on to create their own series, incorporating many of the humor and surrealism of the aforementioned series. These included Pendleton Ward (a former writer and storyboard artist who went on to create Adventure Time), J. G. Quintel (a former creative director and storyboard artist who went on to create Regular Show), Alex Hirsch (a former writer and storyboard artist who went on to create Gravity Falls), and Patrick McHale (a former writer and storyboard artist who went on to create Over the Garden Wall). These shows also had crew members who went on to make their own shows as well, creating what many refer to as the Flapjack family of cartoons.

Awards

References

Works cited

External links

 
 

 
Television series by Cartoon Network Studios
2000s American animated television series
2000s American surreal comedy television series
2008 American television series debuts
2010s American animated television series
2010s American surreal comedy television series
2010 American television series endings
Television series created by Thurop Van Orman
American children's animated adventure television series
American children's animated comedy television series
American children's animated fantasy television series
Animated television series about children
Animated television series about mammals
American surreal comedy television series
Nautical television series
English-language television shows
Fictional sailors
Steampunk television series